Isaac Lihadji (born 10 April 2002) is a French professional footballer who plays as a forward for EFL Championship club Sunderland.

Club career

Marseille
Lihadji made his debut on 24 September 2019 in a Ligue 1 game against Dijon. He replaced Hiroki Sakai after 78 minutes in a 0–0 away draw.

Lille
On 2 July 2020, Lihadji signed with fellow Ligue 1 side Lille OSC.

Sunderland
On 26 January 2023, Lihadji signed a two-and-a-half year deal with Championship side Sunderland, with the option to an extend for a further year. Lihadji's game time was limited early on due to not speaking English, with manager Tony Mowbray saying "He understands when you say his name but beyond that, I need a bit of a help translating. So in the short term, he might be someone who we bring on from the bench to see if he can impact the game with the qualities that he's got.". 

He made his debut on the 11th February 2023 against Reading. Mowbray turned to his bench and introduced Isaac Lihadji, coming on in the 75th minute.

International career
Born in France, Lihadji is of Comorian descent. He is a youth international for France.

Career statistics

Honours
Lille
Ligue 1: 2020–21
Trophée des Champions: 2021

France U17
FIFA U-17 World Cup third place: 2019

References

External links
 
 
 Lille OSC profile 
 

2002 births
Living people
Footballers from Marseille
French footballers
France youth international footballers
France under-21 international footballers
Association football forwards
Olympique de Marseille players
Lille OSC players
Ligue 1 players
French sportspeople of Comorian descent
Olympic footballers of France
Footballers at the 2020 Summer Olympics
Sunderland A.F.C. players
French expatriate footballers
Expatriate footballers in England
French expatriate sportspeople in England
Championnat National 3 players
Championnat National 2 players